Somberi is a 2008 Indian Telugu film directed, written by poet Jonnavithula. Ali plays the lead role while Ruksha, Tanikella Bharani, M. S. Narayana, Dharmavarapu Subramanyam play other roles.

Plot
Sombabu (Ali), the only son of well-to-do farmers, is a pampered guy and a wastrel. His laziness is the talk of the town; though, as is usual with this kind of movies, the village folk are equally eloquent about his good nature.

Being a lout, Sombabu wastes his days roaming around the village with his four stooges, swindling foreigners in the guise of a tourist guide, and consuming liquor in buckets. On one such day, he chances upon Rohini (Ruksha), who has come to the village to do a project on the temple. He promptly falls in love with her, but dallies about proposing.

Meanwhile, a team of three villains (Jeeva, Jayaprakash Reddy, A.V.S. Subramanyam) covet the land belonging to Sombabu's parents. They hatch a plan to get Sombabu out of the way, the upshot of it being that our hero is imprisoned for stealing idols. The movie continues its meandering and mind-numbing path, and ends on an expected note.

Cast
Ali as Sombabu
Ruksha as Rohini
Tanikella Bharani as Kavi 
Dharmavarapu Subramanyam 
M. S. Narayana 
AVS 
Jayaprakash Reddy 
Jeeva
Banerjee 
Gundu Sudharshan
Siva Reddy as  Siva
Duvvasi Mohan
Srinivasa Reddy 
Babloo 
Potti Rambabu 
Gundu Hanumantha Rao 
Ananth
Jr. Relangi 
Jenny
KRJ Sharma
A. V. R. L Narasimha Rao

References

2008 films
2000s Telugu-language films